Cal Ripken Jr. Baseball is a sports video game released in 1992 by Mindscape for the Sega Genesis and Super Nintendo Entertainment System. It was a port of TV Sports: Baseball for home computers.

Gameplay
Due to a lack of licensing from Major League Baseball (MLB), the game features no MLB team names, stadiums, or artwork, and Cal Ripken Jr. himself is the only non-fictitious player in the game. The two game modes that are available are Exhibition and League. In Exhibition mode, players can select the field location as either domed or outdoor. Artificial turf or natural grass can be selected which affects gameplay, with artificial turf being faster. Exhibition allows for single player vs computer, 2 players against each other or an entirely computer simulated game can be watched. In League mode there are 16 teams including the player selected team. If the player is in first place at the end of the league, they will enter the playoffs, and then have the chance to win the pennant. If the player’s team wins the pennant, they will face off against another pennant winner in the World Series.

Reception

References

External links

1992 video games
Baseball video games
Sega Genesis games
Super Nintendo Entertainment System games
Video games developed in Australia
Ripken
Ripken
Video games based on real people
Mindscape games
Multiplayer and single-player video games